Saint-Sernin-sur-Rance (literally Saint-Sernin on Rance) is a commune in the Aveyron department in southern France.

Population

Notable people
 Victor of Aveyron, feral child, found in the commune on January 8, 1800.

See also
Communes of the Aveyron department

References

Communes of Aveyron
Aveyron communes articles needing translation from French Wikipedia